Valter Palm (alias Walter Palm) (23 December 1905 – 3 November 1994) was an Estonian welterweight professional boxer, born in Tallinn, who competed in the 1930s. In the 1920s he took part 1924 Summer Olympics and 1928 Summer Olympics.

1924 Summer Olympics

Welterweight (- 66,7 kg).
 First round – lost to Héctor Méndez (Argentina) (→ did not advance , 17-29th place)

1928 Summer Olympics

Welterweight (- 66,7 kg).
 First round – defeated Albert Nuss (Luxembourg) with points.
 Second round – lost to Raúl Landini (Argentina) with points. (→ did not advance , 9-16th place)

References

External links
Estonian Lexicon of Sportspeople. In Estonian
http://www.boxrec.com/list_bouts.php?human_id=122807&cat=boxer
http://users.skynet.be/hermandw/olymp/sqboxm67.html

1905 births
1994 deaths
Sportspeople from Tallinn
People from Kreis Harrien
Estonian male boxers
Welterweight boxers
Olympic boxers of Estonia
Boxers at the 1924 Summer Olympics
Boxers at the 1928 Summer Olympics
Estonian emigrants to the United States